The 1927–28 Sheffield Shield season was the 32nd season of the Sheffield Shield, the domestic first-class cricket competition of Australia. Victoria won the championship. The method used to decide the championship was a new points system and matches were limited to five days. Don Bradman played in his maiden first-class match, scoring a century for New South Wales against South Australia.

Points system
4 points for a win
3 points for a win on first innings
1 point for a loss on first innings

Table

Statistics

Most Runs
Bill Ponsford 1217

Most Wickets
Clarrie Grimmett 42

References

Sheffield Shield
Sheffield Shield
Sheffield Shield seasons